The 2017 season is Port's 21st season in the Thai League, FA Cup, League Cup.

This is Port F.C.'s name changing.
 1967-2009 as Port Authority of Thailand Football Club (Port Authority of Thailand)
 2009-2013 as  Thai Port Football Club (Thai Port)
 2013–2015 as Singhtarua Football Club (Singhtarua)
 2015–present as "Port Football Club" (Port)

Competitions

Thai League

Matches

Thai FA Cup

Thai League Cup

Squad goals statistics

External links
 
 Thai League Official Website

Port
2017